Isabelle Forrer (born 28 March 1982) is a Swiss beach volleyball player. She represented her country at the 2016 Summer Olympics with doubles partner Anouk Vergé-Dépré. Forrer and Vergé-Dépré were eliminated in the round of 16 by German pair Laura Ludwig and Kira Walkenhorst (the eventual gold medal winners). Forrer and Vergé-Dépré finished 9th. The pair competed at the 2016 World Tour Finals in Toronto and won the bronze medal. They won the bronze medal match against Larissa Franca and Talita Antunes of Brazil in straight sets (21-19, 21-18).

References

External links
 
 
 

1982 births
Living people
Swiss beach volleyball players
Beach volleyball players at the 2016 Summer Olympics
Olympic beach volleyball players of Switzerland
Swiss sportswomen
Women's beach volleyball players